The Slate, or Blue Slate, is a breed of domestic turkey known for the slate gray color of its plumage. Lighter birds are sometimes called Lavender turkeys. Turkeys of the Slate breed may actually be any number of shades between pure black and white, but only ash-gray birds are eligible for showing under the directive of the American Poultry Association’s ‘’Standard of Perfection’’, into which they admitted as a variety in 1874. Slate turkeys are listed as critically endangered by the American Livestock Breeds Conservancy, and meet the definition of a heritage turkey breed.

References

See also
 List of turkey breeds
 Heritage turkey

Turkey breeds originating in the United States
Conservation Priority Breeds of the Livestock Conservancy